The 1930 Utah State Aggies football team was an American football team that represented Utah State Agricultural College in the Rocky Mountain Conference (RMC) during the 1930 college football season. In their 12th season under head coach Dick Romney, the Aggies compiled a 3–5–1 record (3–4–1 against RMC opponents), tied for seventh place in the conference, and were outscored by a total of 205 to 73.

Schedule

References

Utah State
Utah State Aggies football seasons
Utah State Aggies football